Thomas King Forçade (September 11, 1945 – November 17, 1978), also known as Gary Goodson, was an American underground journalist and cannabis rights activist in the 1970s. For many years he ran the Underground Press Syndicate (later called the Alternative Press Syndicate), and was the founder of High Times magazine. 

Forçade published several other publications, such as Stoned, National Weed, Dealer and others, that, veiled as counterculture entertainment magazines, were laced with humor and savvy coverage of politics and popular culture, and served as a forum for some of the industry's best writers and artists. Many of Forçade's publications' writers went on to be published in premiere papers and magazines in North America.

Life and career
He was born in Phoenix, Arizona. His father, engineer and hot rod enthusiast Kenneth Goodson, died in a car crash when Forçade was a child.

Forçade graduated from the University of Utah in 1967 with a degree in business administration. He went into the United States Air Force but was discharged after a few months. He used the skills he learned, however, to fly across the border for several years, trafficking drugs from Mexico and Colombia, and used his proceeds to form a hippie commune and underground magazine called Orpheus.  

After this, he moved to New York City, where he first took over management of the Underground Press Syndicate, a network of countercultural newspapers and magazines that he helped found. The name was changed to the Alternative Press Syndicate in 1973.

In 1970, Forçade was the first documented activist to use pieing as a form of protest, hitting Chairman Otto Larsen during the President's Commission on Obscenity and Pornography.

In summer 1974, he founded High Times, and contributed funding to the Yippie newspaper, Yipster Times, while also bankrolling the ailing Punk magazine.

High Times ran articles calling marijuana a "medical wonder drug" and ridiculing the US Drug Enforcement Administration. It became a huge success, with a circulation of more than 500,000 copies a month and revenues approaching $10 million by 1977, and was embraced by the young adult market as the bible of the alternative life culture. By 1977 High Times was selling as many copies an issue as Rolling Stone and National Lampoon.

According to the 1990 nonfiction book 12 Days on the Road: The Sex Pistols and America, by Noel E. Monk, Forçade and his film crew followed the Sex Pistols through their chaotic January 1978 concerts of the U.S. South and West, using high-pressure tactics in an unsuccessful attempt to persuade the band's management and record company to let him document the tour.

Death
Forçade committed suicide by gunshot to the head in November 1978 in his Greenwich Village apartment after the death of his best friend, Jack Coombs. Forçade had attempted suicide before and bequeathed trusts to benefit High Times and NORML.

References

External links
Biography of Forçade from World War 4 Report

Tom Forçade Interview (published posthumously in HiLife magazine, Sept 1979)
Yippies vs. Zippies: New Rubin book reveals ’70s counterculture feud (The Villager article by Mary Reinholz, 25 February 2018)

1945 births
1978 deaths
1978 suicides
20th-century American journalists
20th-century American writers
American cannabis activists
American male journalists
American political writers
American publishers (people)
Cannabis writers
Free speech activists
Suicides by firearm in New York City
University of Utah alumni
Writers from Phoenix, Arizona
Yippies